Ashcherino is a rural locality (a village) in Klyazminskoye Rural Settlement, Kovrovsky District, Vladimir Oblast, Russia. The population was 17 as of 2010. There are 3 streets.

Geography 
Ashcherino is located 11 km east of Kovrov (the district's administrative centre) by road. Tsepelevo is the nearest rural locality.

References 

Rural localities in Kovrovsky District